David Gardiner (born 11 February 1957) is a Guatemalan footballer. He competed in the men's tournament at the 1988 Summer Olympics. Gardiner was a member of the Guatemalan team that won a bronze medal at the 1983 Pan American Games.

References

External links
 

1957 births
Living people
Guatemalan footballers
Guatemala international footballers
Olympic footballers of Guatemala
Footballers at the 1988 Summer Olympics
Pan American Games bronze medalists for Guatemala
Pan American Games medalists in football
Footballers at the 1983 Pan American Games
Place of birth missing (living people)
Association football defenders
Medalists at the 1983 Pan American Games
20th-century Guatemalan people
21st-century Guatemalan people